Leah-Simone Bowen is a Canadian writer, producer, and director.

Personal life 
Bowen was born in Edmonton, Alberta. She is a first generation Canadian whose family is from Barbados.  Bowen currently lives in Toronto, Ontario.

Work and education 
Bowen attended the University of Alberta's theatre program. She was the artistic producer at Obsidian Theatre.

In 2016 Bowen was appointed as the theatre grants officer for the Toronto Arts Council.  In 2018 Bowen's book The Flood was published by Playwrights Canada Press. The book is based on the history of the St. Lawrence Market in Toronto, Ontario and the history of female prisoners in Canada.

Theatre 
Bowen has served as playwirght-in-residence at a number of Canadian theatre companies including: the Blyth Festival, Stratford Festival, Cahotts Theatre, Playwright's Workshop Montreal and Obsidian Theatre.

She has been involved in a number of theatre productions including:

 Treemonisha (2020), playwright  
 The Hallway (2015), playwright.
 Nowheresville
 Code Word: Time, playwright
 The Postman (2015), playwright.
 The Hours That Remain (2012), assistant director.
 Job's Wife, Summerworks Festival (2009), Third Eye.

Podcasting 
Bowen is the creator of the Canadian Broadcasting Corporation podcast, Secret Life of Canada, which she co-hosts with Falen Johnson. This podcast focuses on little known parts of Canadian history and explores the histories of marginalized communities in Canada.

References 

Living people
21st-century Canadian women artists
University of Alberta alumni
Year of birth missing (living people)